Antony Gerardus Fennema (2 April 1902 – 30 July 1984) was a Dutch rower. He competed in the men's eight event at the 1924 Summer Olympics.

References

External links
 

1902 births
1984 deaths
Dutch male rowers
Olympic rowers of the Netherlands
Rowers at the 1924 Summer Olympics
People from Sneek
Sportspeople from Friesland